Wesley Duke (born June 21, 1981) is a football player. Duke was a tight end for the Denver Broncos in the National Football League.

Biography
Duke was born in Grand Prairie, Texas. He played both basketball and football for the Meadowcreek High School Mustangs in Norcross, Georgia.

Duke played NCAA basketball for the Mercer University Bears in Macon, Georgia.

Despite not playing college football, Duke was signed as an undrafted free agent by the Denver Broncos. Duke tore his knee ligament and was released on June 9, 2006.

References

External links
Denver Broncos bio

1981 births
Living people
People from Grand Prairie, Texas
American football tight ends
Mercer Bears men's basketball players
Denver Broncos players
American men's basketball players